Scanning microscopy may refer to:

 Scanning probe microscopy
 Atomic force microscopy
 Scanning tunneling microscope
 Scanning electron microscope
 Scanning capacitance microscopy
 Near-field scanning optical microscope

Microscopes